Ablabesmyia paivai is a species of fly described by Jean-Jacques Kieffer in 1910 . No sub-species specified in Catalogue of Life.

References

Tanypodinae
Insects described in 1910